Álvaro Rafael Martín Uriol (born 18 June 1994 in Llerena) is a Spanish racewalker. He competed in the 20 km walk at the 2012 Summer Olympics but did not finish the race.

Competition record

References

External links
 
 
 
 

1994 births
Living people
Spanish male racewalkers
Olympic athletes of Spain
Athletes (track and field) at the 2012 Summer Olympics
Athletes (track and field) at the 2016 Summer Olympics
Athletes (track and field) at the 2020 Summer Olympics
Athletes (track and field) at the 2010 Summer Youth Olympics
World Athletics Championships athletes for Spain
People from Campiña Sur (Badajoz)
Sportspeople from the Province of Badajoz
European Athletics Championships winners
Spanish Athletics Championships winners